Ortucchio is a comune and town in the province of L'Aquila in the Abruzzo region of central Italy.

See also
Castello Piccolomini (Ortucchio)
Fucino Space Centre

References

 
Marsica